The M95 is a short metropolitan route in Johannesburg, South Africa.

Route 
The M95 begins at the M7 and ends at the R554.

References 

Streets and roads of Johannesburg
Metropolitan routes in Johannesburg